Bytes for All v. Federation of Pakistan, (958/2013) commonly known as the YouTube case is a 2013 Lahore High Court case regarding Internet freedom and censorship in Pakistan. The case was filed by Pakistani non-profit human rights organization BytesForAll, Pakistan, and argued by lawyer Yasser Latif Hamdani. In this case, BytesForAll challenges internet filtering and surveillance by the Pakistan Telecommunication Authority, especially regarding YouTube.

After 14 hearings, Justice Mr Mansoor Ali Shah of Lahore High Court referred the case to the larger bench on 19 September 2013. A 3 or 5 member bench of Lahore High Court will now deliberate the case.

YouTube was banned in Pakistan, amid rioting and protests in September 2012 after the appearance of a low-budget film called Innocence of Muslims on YouTube. The ban persists. The constitutional challenges argues that the blanket ban on YouTube is unconstitutional as it violates the right to freedom of expression and speech guaranteed by the Constitution of Pakistan.

References

Lahore High Court
Freedom of speech in Pakistan
Internet in Pakistan
2013 in law
2013 in Pakistan